Gonbad Chay (also Romanized as Gonbad Chāy and Gonbad Chā’ī; also known as Komeh Chāy and Kumma Chāi) is a village in Jeyhun Dasht Rural District, Shara District, Hamadan County, Hamadan Province, Iran. At the 2006 census, its population was 568, in 139 families.

References 

Populated places in Hamadan County